The Macchi M.71 was an Italian flying boat fighter of the 1930s designed and manufactured by Macchi.

Design and development

In 1930, Macchi built a new version of its M.41bis flying boat fighter designed for launching by catapult from warships of the Regia Marina (Italian Royal Navy). The new aircraft, the M.71, built to the same dimensions as the M.41bis and aerodynamically very clean for an aircraft of its type, was identical to the M.41bis in most ways, being a wooden, single-seat, single-bay biplane armed with two fixed, forward-firing  machine guns, plywood and fabric skinning, unstaggered wings of equal span, a  Fiat A.20 engine driving a pusher propeller mounted on struts above the hull and below the upper wing, and fitted with a vertical radiator. 

The M.71 differed from the M.41bis in having a stronger wing cellule and catapult pick-up points and, to facilitate rapid assembly and disassambly during shipboard operations, it had inclined steel tube struts between the hull, interplane struts, and upper wing section instead of the M.41biss bracing wires.

Operational history
The Regia Marina accepted the M.71 for service, and Macchi built a small number of them, probably no more than twelve. They briefly saw service aboard Regia Marina warships during the 1930s until the IMAM Ro.43 reconnaissance floatplane and IMAM Ro.44 floatplane fighter replaced them.

Operators

 Regia Marina

Specifications

See also

Notes

References

Green, William, and Gordon Swanborough. The Complete Book of Fighters: An Illustrated Encyclopedia of Every Fighter Aircraft Built and Flown. New York: SMITHMARK Publishers, 1994. .

M.71
Flying boats
1930s Italian fighter aircraft